Kapidony is a rural locality (a village) in Kultayevskoye Rural Settlement, Permsky District, Perm Krai, Russia. The population was 6 as of 2010. There are 13 streets.

Geography 
Kapidony is located 28 km southwest of Perm (the district's administrative centre) by road. Kosoturikha is the nearest rural locality.

References 

Rural localities in Permsky District